"Unusual" is a song by American recording artist Trey Songz, released as the fourth official single from his fourth studio album, Passion, Pain & Pleasure (2010). featuring Drake. It is produced by Pop & Oak, Dexter Wansel, Ezekiel Lewis and Drake.

Writing and composition
The horns, strings, guitar, were originally recorded by Pop's father Dexter with the intention of being used for samples in new recordings. Pop then chopped and sampled from those recordings. The beat was intended to be given to Kanye West but Mike Caren an A&R at Atlantic Records received it and had the idea of creating an R&B record to it.

Release and reception
"Unusual" was sent by Atlantic Records and Songbook for urban contemporary airplay on May 17, 2011. The song debuted at number eighty-five on the US Hot R&B/Hip-Hop Songs chart dated October 16, 2010, and went on to peak at forty-eight Upon release, "Unusual" re-entered the chart at ten and has since peaked at number seven on the R&B chart in its twenty-fourth charting week. It also debuted at #90 on the Billboard Hot 100 and has reached a current peak of #68.

Charts

Weekly charts

Year-end charts

References

2011 singles
Trey Songz songs
Drake (musician) songs
Songs written by Drake (musician)
Songs written by Ezekiel Lewis
2010 songs
Atlantic Records singles
Songs written by Trey Songz
Songs written by Pop Wansel
Songs written by Oak Felder
Songs written by John Maultsby
Songs written by Dexter Wansel
Song recordings produced by Pop & Oak